"Just About Over You" is a song recorded by American country music singer Priscilla Block. It was released as a single on October 9, 2020, from her debut self-titled EP. Block co-wrote the song with Emily Kroll and Sarah Jones, and it was produced by Justin Johnson.

Content
Block released the track via TikTok in August 2020, and received over three million views and gained a following of over three hundred thousand fans. Subsequently, her fans donated to help Block record the song.

She told Theboot the story behind the song: "'Just About Over You' was actually a title that I had in my head for a long time – like, 'I'm almost over you' or 'I'm just about over you'. I had run into an ex-boyfriend, and I remember, that night, I was feeling like, [...] It's the whole idea of, you can literally convince yourself anything by putting a bandaid on it, and it was me convincing myself that I was over it when I wasn't."

Critical reception
The song was named one of the best songs of 2020 by The New York Times.

Music video
The music video was released on November 24, 2020, and was directed by Logen Christopher. According to the description on Universal Music Group Nashville's website, it depicts "the real-life scenario behind the heartbreak singalong after a late-night run in with her ex-boyfriend."

Charts

Weekly charts

Year-end charts

Certifications

References

2020 debut singles
2020 songs
Priscilla Block songs
Mercury Nashville singles